The Walney Channel separates Walney Island from the British mainland.
The northern portion of the channel opens into the Duddon Estuary and is both narrower and shallower. The southern half of the channel is wider and is regularly dredged to allow shipping to access the Port of Barrow. This half opens into Morecambe Bay.

The channel is spanned by Walney Bridge (officially Jubilee Bridge) completed in 1908. Because of the needs of navigation, particularly the activities of the Vickers shipyard, it was constructed as a bascule bridge.

References

External links
Walney Channel. Walney Webs

Geography of Cumbria
Channels of England
Dredged rivers and waterways